FC Dnipro-3 Dnipropetrovsk is a Ukrainian football team based in Dnipropetrovsk, Ukraine. The team is the 3rd squad team or junior team from the FC Dnipro Dnipropetrovsk franchise.

The team spent a short stint in the Ukrainian Second Division. After the reserve club Dnipro-2 was promoted to the Persha Liha after the 1999–2000 season the club's  administration decide to enter the 3rd squad team or junior team into Ukrainian Second Division.
However, after 2 seasons the club was relegated from the professional ranks.

League and cup history

{|class="wikitable"
|-bgcolor="#efefef"
! Season
! Div.
! Pos.
! Pl.
! W
! D
! L
! GS
! GA
! P
!Domestic Cup
!colspan=2|Europe
!Notes
|-
|align=center|2000–01
|align=center|3rd "B"
|align=center bgcolor=tan|3
|align=center|28
|align=center|16
|align=center|5
|align=center|7
|align=center|35
|align=center|21
|align=center|53
|align=center|1/32 finals Second League Cup
|align=center|
|align=center|
|align=center|
|-
|align=center|2001–02
|align=center|3rd "C"
|align=center|17
|align=center|34
|align=center|6
|align=center|8
|align=center|20
|align=center|31
|align=center|53
|align=center|26
|align=center|
|align=center|
|align=center|
|align=center bgcolor=red|Relegated|
|}

 
2000 establishments in Ukraine
2002 disestablishments in Ukraine
Football clubs in Dnipro
Dnipro-3 Dnipropetrovsk
FC Dnipro
Ukrainian reserve football teams
Association football clubs established in 2000
Association football clubs disestablished in 2002